In Greek mythology, Alectryon (Ancient Greek: Ἀλεκτρυόνος means 'cock') may refer to the following personages:

 Alectryon, a young soldier who was assigned by Ares to stand guard outside his door while the god indulged in a love affair with Aphrodite.
 Alectryon, also called Alector, father of Leitus, and in some accounts of Clonius, Arcesilaus and Prothoenor. All four were leaders of the Boeotian contingent against Troy.

Notes

References 

 Homer, The Iliad with an English Translation by A.T. Murray, Ph.D. in two volumes. Cambridge, MA., Harvard University Press; London, William Heinemann, Ltd. 1924. . Online version at the Perseus Digital Library.
 Homer, Homeri Opera in five volumes. Oxford, Oxford University Press. 1920. . Greek text available at the Perseus Digital Library.
 Tzetzes, John, Allegories of the Iliad translated by Goldwyn, Adam J. and Kokkini, Dimitra. Dumbarton Oaks Medieval Library, Harvard University Press, 2015. 

Boeotian characters in Greek mythology